Grete Andersen can refer to:
Greta Andersen (born 1927), Danish swimmer
Grete Waitz (born Andersen, 1953–2011), Norwegian runner
Grethe Andersen (born 1966), Norwegian politician